The Literary League Association was a political and cultural organization in Iraq. The party was founded in Najaf in 1932. Its president was Sheikh Mohammed Ali Al-Yacubi. The Association was particularly active during the May 1941 revolution.

References

Defunct political parties in Iraq
Political parties established in 1932